Hidden Lake is a lake,  long, lying midway between Lagrelius Point and Cape Obelisk in the western part of James Ross Island. It was discovered in 1945 by the Falkland Islands Dependencies Survey, who so named it because it is obscured by surrounding highlands.

References

Lakes of Antarctica
Bodies of water of Graham Land
Landforms of James Ross Island